is an academic journal covering research on Oriental art, museology, and conservation science, with a particular focus on Japanese art. It is published bimonthly in Japanese by the Tokyo National Museum, with some summaries in English.

See also
 Cultural Properties of Japan

References

External links 
 

Japanese studies journals
Japanese-language journals
Museology journals
Publications established in 1951
Bimonthly journals
Arts journals
Academic journals published by museums